Kimmich is a surname of German and Swiss-German origin. Notable people with the surname include:

Christoph M. Kimmich (born 1939), German-American historian and eighth President of Brooklyn College
Jon Kimmich, American businessman
Joshua Kimmich (born 1995), German footballer
Karl Kimmich (1880–1945), German banker 
Marc Kimmich (born 1983), Australian tennis player
Max W. Kimmich (1893–1980), German film director and screenwriter 
Wilhelm Kimmich (1897–1986), German painter

References

Surnames of German origin
Swiss-German surnames